Toramus is a genus of pleasing fungus beetles in the family Erotylidae. There are about nine described species in Toramus.

Species
These nine species belong to the genus Toramus:
 Toramus acutus (Reitter, 1875) i c g
 Toramus bisignatus (Horn, 1895) i c g
 Toramus chamaeropis (Schaeffer, 1904) i c g b
 Toramus formosianus (Grouvelle, 1913) g
 Toramus hirtellus (Schwarz, 1878) i c g
 Toramus obsoletus (Casey, 1900) i c g
 Toramus pulchellus (LeConte, 1863) i c g b
 Toramus quadrinotatus (Casey, 1924) i c g
 Toramus ventricosus (Casey, 1924) i c g
Data sources: i = ITIS, c = Catalogue of Life, g = GBIF, b = Bugguide.net

References

Further reading

External links

 

Erotylidae
Articles created by Qbugbot